Why Do They Rock So Hard? is the third full-length studio album by the ska punk band Reel Big Fish.

This is the only Reel Big Fish studio album where the band line-up has not changed from the previous album.

Aaron Barrett has said in two interviews that this was his favorite album until the release of Our Live Album Is Better than Your Live Album. The album was mixed at Scream Studios by Tim Palmer.

Track listing

 Notes
 A cover of the A-ha song "Take On Me" (2:54) appears on some international releases in between "Somebody Hates Me" and "Brand New Song".
 Titled "In the Pit" on subsequent albums.
  On the clean version of this album, "Song #3" is stripped of its vocal track and called "Sleep All Day".
 Hidden track; begins with 5:20 silence. On the Japanese release, a cover of the Duran Duran song "Hungry Like the Wolf" (3:39) appears in place of this track.

Personnel
Reel Big Fish
Aaron Barrett – guitar, lead vocals, synthesizer, celesta
Grant Barry – trombone
Andrew Gonzales – drums
Scott Klopfenstein – trumpet, vocals, keyboards, Celesta
Dan Regan – trombone, screams
Tavis Werts – trumpet, flügelhorn
Matt Wong – bass guitar, vocals

Additional musicians
Coolie Ranx (Pilfers) – vocals on tracks 6 & 10
Brandon Werts – percussion
Sam Avila – organ
John Avila – piano
True: 129 – scratching
Jay Gordon – backing vocals

Production
Tim Palmer – mixing
Joe Zook – mixing
Jay Rifkin – executive producer
Steve Baughman – engineer
Jay Gordon – engineer
Steve Gamberoni – engineer
Jenny O. – art direction
Dave Holdredge – digital editing
David Holdrege – digital editing
John Avila – producer, mixing
Donnell Cameron – engineer, mixing
Kevin Dean – engineer
Lisa Johnson – photography

Charts

References

External links

Why Do They Rock So Hard? at YouTube (streamed copy where licensed)

1998 albums
Reel Big Fish albums
Mojo Records albums
Albums produced by John Avila